Guinée Championnat National (simply known as Ligue 1 Pro) is the top division of the Guinean Football Federation, it was created in 1965.

Ligue 1 Pro 2021–22 teams

Champions

1965 : AS Kaloum Star
1966 : Hafia FC
1967 : Hafia FC
1968 : Hafia FC
1969 : AS Kaloum Star
1970 : AS Kaloum Star
1971 : Hafia FC 
1972 : Hafia FC 
1973 : Hafia FC 
1974 : Hafia FC 
1975 : Hafia FC 
1976 : Hafia FC 
1977 : Hafia FC 
1978 : Hafia FC 
1979 : Hafia FC 
1980 : AS Kaloum Star 
1981 : AS Kaloum Star 
1982 : Hafia FC
1983 : Hafia FC 
1984 : AS Kaloum Star 
1985 : Hafia FC 
1986 : Horoya AC 
1987 : AS Kaloum Star 
1988 : Horoya AC 
1989 : Horoya AC 
1990 : Horoya AC 
1991 : Horoya AC 
1992 : Horoya AC 
1993 : AS Kaloum Star 
1994 : Horoya AC 
1995 : AS Kaloum Star 
1996 : AS Kaloum Star 
1997 : Championship Cancelled
1998 : AS Kaloum Star 
1999 : No Championship
2000 : Horoya AC 
2001 : Horoya AC 
2002 : Satellite FC 
2003 : ASFAG 
2004 : Championship Cancelled Due To Financial Problems
2005 : Satellite FC 
2006 : Fello Star
2006–07 : AS Kaloum Star 
2007–08 : Fello Star
2008–09 : Fello Star
2009–10 : Fello Star
2010–11 : Horoya AC
2011–12 : Horoya AC
2012–13 : Horoya AC
2013–14 : AS Kaloum Star 
2014–15 : Horoya AC
2015–16 : Horoya AC
2016–17 : Horoya AC
2017–18 : Horoya AC
2018–19 : Horoya AC
2019–20 : Horoya AC
2020–21 : Horoya AC
2021–22 : Horoya AC

Performance by club

Qualification for African competitions

Association ranking for 2020–21 CAF competitions
Association ranking for 2020–21 CAF Champions League and 2020–21 CAF Confederation Cup will be based on results from each CAF tournament (Champions League and Confederation Cup) from 2016 to 2019–20.

Legend
 CL: CAF Champions League
 CC: CAF Confederation Cup

Sponsorship and Naming

Top scorers

References

External links
RSSSF competition history

 
Football leagues in Guinea
Guinea